Udayapuram Sulthan is a 1999 Indian Malayalam-language comedy-drama film directed by Jose Thomas and written by Udayakrishna-Siby K. Thomas, it stars Dileep, Narendra Prasad, Preetha Vijaykumar, Shruthi Raj, Captain Raju, Innocent, Cochin Hanifa, Jagathy Sreekumar, Harisree Ashokan, Ambika, Sudheesh, Salim Kumar, Sphadikam George, Kottayam Nazir, and Oduvil Unnikrishnan.

The film did well in box office and was remade in Telugu as Denikaina Ready, in Bengali as Khiladi and in Odia as Sundergarh Ra Salman Khan.

Plot
Avittam Thirunal Narayana Varma, scion of Udayapuram royal family has a daughter named Malavika Thampuratti, who walks out of the palace after falling for Abdul Rahman. Sulaiman, the son of Abdul Rahman and Malavika Thampuratti, is nurtured in Carnatic classical music by his mother. His opponent in college, Unnikrishnan, son of a deceased Brahmin priest is also good at singing.

Unnikrishnan wins a musical competition at college which makes him sing at the famous Chembai Sangeethotsavam, but in a mistake of identities, Sulaiman makes it to the musical gala. He becomes famous among the people due to his singing that the viewers begin to appreciate him a lot.

Sulaiman is forced to go to his grandfather's place to join a religious function. But Gopika falls for Sulaiman instead of Unnikrishnan. In the end, we see that history repeats itself. Will the palace will get a sultan or not? This forms the remaining story of the film.

Cast

Soundtrack
Both the music of the songs and lyrics were written by Kaithapram Damodaran Namboothiri.

Remade
It was remade in Telugu as Dhenikaina Ready, starring Vishnu Manchu and Hansika Motwani in 2012. The movie was dubbed in Malayalam as 'Endhinum Ready' and was released simultaneously with Telugu on 24 October 2012. It was also remade in Bengali titled Khiladi.

References

External links
 

1990s Malayalam-language films
1990s action comedy-drama films
1999 films
Malayalam films remade in other languages
Films scored by Kaithapram Damodaran Namboothiri
Indian action comedy-drama films
Films with screenplays by Udayakrishna-Siby K. Thomas
Films directed by Jose Thomas
1999 comedy films